Dun Bhruichlinn is an Iron Age fort south of Esknish, Islay, Scotland. The fort, or dun is circular with an internal diameter of 16 metres and the walls stand to a maximum height of 0.5 metres. It stands among trees on a low ridge.

References
RCAHMS Canmore - Site - Dun Bhruichlinn

Islay
Iron Age sites in Scotland